Minayev is a rural locality (a khutor) in Tormosinovskoye Rural Settlement, Chernyshkovsky District, Volgograd Oblast, Russia. The population was 4 as of 2010.

Geography 
Minayev is located in southwest of Vologda Oblast, 78 km southeast of the Chernyshkovsky (the district's administrative centre) by road. Komarov is the nearest rural locality.

References 

Rural localities in Chernyshkovsky District